Charles Morgan Herbert Atherton (November 19, 1874 – December 17, 1935) was an American Major League Baseball third baseman. He was an accomplished musician and writer, as well as an athlete.

Early life
He was born in New Brunswick, New Jersey, the son of George W. Atherton and Frances “Fannie” Wright Darusmont Washburn, of Plympton, Massachusetts. His father, a Civil War veteran, at the time was a professor of political science at Rutgers University. In 1882, at the age of 9 he moved to Philadelphia when his father took over as president of Pennsylvania State University.

Atherton loved baseball as well as football. He was Penn State's first sports star as a member of the school's baseball and football teams. He is also credited with inventing the place kick.

Sports career
He was an early professional football player and coach for the Greensburg Athletic Association. He also played professional football in 1896 for the Pittsburgh Athletic Club.

He made his Major League debut on May 30, 1899 at the age of 24. He hit .248 in 242 at bats in 1899, which would end up being his only Major League season.

He also hit 5 doubles, 6 triples and had 23 RBI. Defensively, Atherton committed 26 errors, which was fourth worst on the now defunct Washington Senators team of the National League. He played his final game on August 22, 1899.

Travels
He travelled to a Russia as part of the YMCA. He was based in Petrograd, hosted by the Czech Legion, who were aligned to the Russian Imperial Army. He witnessed the Russian Revolution, World War I.

He had become acquainted with Vincent Pisek of Malesov, an American Czech pastor who invited him to become the musical director of the Jan Hus Presbyterian Church in New York City. Atherton learned the Czech language and became a student of Czech and Slovak Folk Songs. He travelled to 
Vladivostok in 1919 to encourage the evacuation of the Czech Legion, who were stranded in Siberia in the aftermath of the First World War. Upon his return he published a book titled “Favorite songs of the Czech Slovak Army in Russia”. His late elder brother, Frank Peabody Atherton (1868-1911) had been a musical composer.

Atherton continued to live in New York City during the 1920s undertaking a role as a social worker for Czechs and Bohemians through his church. He continued to travel back and forth the Atlantic, between New York and Bremen, between 1928 on SS America and 1934 on SS Europa. He was very familiar with Central Europe and his books were published in Czech and included a collection of Czech and Slovak folk songs he had captured that were sung by soldiers during their time in Siberia. It was a time of political turmoil and he witnessed the Nazis rise to power first hand. He documented each event in highly descriptive letters to his sister, Harriet, who he called Hattie.

Death
He died on December 17, 1935, at the age of 60 of tuberculosis. He was buried at Vienna Central Cemetery, in Austria on December 21, 1935.

Legacy
Pennsylvania State University library holds an oral history interview with his sister Helen Atherton Govier from January 25, 1974.

Ancestry
He is a direct descendant of James Atherton, one of the First Settlers of New England; who arrived in Dorchester, Massachusetts in the 1630s.

Bibliography

References

External links

1874 births
1934 deaths
19th-century baseball players
Players of American football from New Jersey
Baseball players from New Jersey
Sportspeople from New Brunswick, New Jersey
Major League Baseball third basemen
Washington Senators (1891–1899) players
Pittsburgh Athletic Club (football) players
Penn State Nittany Lions football players
Penn State Nittany Lions baseball players
Greensburg Athletic Association coaches
Greensburg Athletic Association players
19th-century players of American football
Altoona Mad Turtles players
Scranton Indians players
Shenandoah Huns players
Houston Buffaloes players
Wilkes-Barre Coal Barons players
Milwaukee Brewers (minor league) players
Milwaukee Creams players
Columbus Senators players
Buffalo Bisons (minor league) players
Los Angeles Angels (minor league) players
Los Angeles (minor league baseball) players
Montreal Royals players
Indianapolis Indians players
Johnstown Johnnies players
Portland Beavers players
Montreal Royals managers
Burials at the Vienna Central Cemetery
Wilkes-Barre/Mount Carmel players